The coat of arms of Kenya features two lions, a symbol of protection, holding spears and a traditional East African shield. The shield and spears symbolize unity and defence of freedom. The shield contains the national colours, representing:

 Black for the people of Kenya.
 Red for the blood shed during the struggle for freedom.
 Green for the agriculture and natural resources.
 White for unity and peace.
On the shield is a rooster holding an axe while moving forward, portraying authority, the will to work, success, and the break of a new dawn. It is also the symbol of Kenya African National Union (KANU) party that led the country to independence.

The shield and lions stand on a silhouette of Mount Kenya containing in the foreground examples of Kenya agricultural produce - coffee, pyrethrum, sisal, tea, maize and pineapples.

The coat of arms is supported by a scroll upon which is written the word 'Harambee'. In Swahili, Harambee means "pulling together" or "all for one".

Description 
Kenya national law lays forth a heraldic blazon, or official description of the coat of arms:

Arms.— Per fess sable and vert, on a fess gules fimbriated argent a cock grasping in the dexter claw an axe also argent.

Supporters.— On either side a lion or, grasping in the interior forepaw a spear of estate, the hafts of the spears crossed in saltire behind the shield. They are meant to protect the chicken.

The whole upon a compartment representing Mount Kenya proper.

Motto.— Harambee.

See also
 Coat of arms of Kenyan Counties

References 
 https://web.archive.org/web/20160414141638/http://arkafrica.com/projects/kenya-coat-arms

National symbols of Kenya
Kenya
Kenya
Kenya
Kenya
Kenya
Kenya
Kenya
Kenya
Kenya
Kenya